Pecker ("someone who or something which pecks") usually refers to the American dialect or slang term for

 penis

It may also refer to:

 some birds, especially the woodpecker but sometimes flowerpecker, oxpecker or (rarely) berrypecker
 Pecker, a 1998 movie directed by John Waters
 Pecker’s soundtrack, released as an album
 Cory Pecker (born 1981), Canadian ice hockey player
 David Pecker (born 1951), American publisher
 Jean-Claude Pecker (1923–2020), French astronomer
 "Pecker", the nickname of the darts player Brian Woods
 1629 Pecker, an asteroid discovered in 1952 by astronomer Louis Boyer
 Pecker, a character from the Jak and Daxter video game series
 Boris Pecker, a fictional character in Ben Elton's Dead Famous
 an electric motor's terminal connection box, in American slang
 a nose or courage, in British slang

See also
Pekka (name)